Ary Fernandes (March 31, 1931 – August 29, 2010) was a Brazilian playwright, actor, producer and filmmaker.  He was born in São Paulo.

Selected filmography
 Il domestico (1974)

References

External links

1931 births
2010 deaths
Brazilian male film actors
Brazilian film producers
Brazilian film directors
Brazilian screenwriters
Brazilian male dramatists and playwrights
20th-century Brazilian dramatists and playwrights
20th-century Brazilian male writers